Daniil Nikolayev may refer to:

 Daniil Nikolayev (footballer, born 1991), Russian football player
 Daniil Nikolayev (footballer, born 2002), Russian football player